Thomas ("Tom") Anthony Petryshen (born January 3, 1969 in Vancouver, British Columbia) is a former Olympic wrestler from Canada. He finished ninth in the '92 games in Barcelona. He began his grappling career as a thirteen-year-old in Surrey, British Columbia and went on to wrestle for Simon Fraser University and represent Canada at the international level.

See also
 Wrestling at the 1992 Summer Olympics - Men's freestyle 48 kg

References

1969 births
Living people
Olympic wrestlers of Canada
Wrestlers at the 1992 Summer Olympics
Canadian male sport wrestlers
Sportspeople from Vancouver